Adil Candemir (1917 – 12 January 1989) was a Turkish sport wrestler. He was born in Amasya. He won a silver medal in freestyle wrestling, middleweight class, at the 1948 Summer Olympics in London.

References

External links
 

1917 births
1989 deaths
People from Amasya
Wrestlers at the 1948 Summer Olympics
Turkish people of Circassian descent
Turkish male sport wrestlers
Olympic wrestlers of Turkey
Olympic silver medalists for Turkey
Olympic medalists in wrestling
Medalists at the 1948 Summer Olympics
20th-century Turkish people